Denys Pidruchnyi (born 10 July 2001) is a professional Ukrainian football midfielder who played for FC Oleksandriya.

Career
Born in Kyiv, Pidruchnyi began to play football in his native city, where he joined local Obolon-Zmina youth sportive school.

After spent two years in Lithuania, he returned to Ukraine and in February 2020 signed contract with FC Oleksandriya and played in the Ukrainian Premier League Reserves competition.

References

External links 
 
 

2000 births
Living people
Piddubny Olympic College alumni
Footballers from Kyiv
Ukrainian footballers
Association football midfielders
FC Stumbras players
FC Kramatorsk players
FC Oleksandriya players
A Lyga players
Ukrainian First League players
Ukrainian expatriate footballers
Expatriate footballers in Lithuania
Ukrainian expatriate sportspeople in Lithuania
Ukraine youth international footballers